Maikol Yordan Traveling Lost (Spanish: Maikol Yordan de Viaje Perdido) is a Costa Rican comedy film produced by the quartet of comedians La Media Docena (The Half Dozen). The film stars Mario Chacon, Daniel Moreno, Erick Hernandez, Edgar Murillo, Natalia Monge and Adal Ramones. The film was directed by Miguel Gómez and it was released in 2014. It was filmed on locations in Costa Rica, Mexico, England, Italy and France. Maikol Yordan Traveling Lost tells the story of Maikol Yordan Soto Sibaja, a naive and good-natured Costa Rican farmer and his adventures traveling in Europe as he tries to prevent an evil businessman from taking over his family's farm. The film became the most watched Costa Rican film in history.

References

External links

2014 films
2014 comedy films
Costa Rican comedy films
Films set in Costa Rica
Films shot in Costa Rica